Joe Greenwald (December 2, 1888 – May 19, 1986) was an American equestrian. He competed in the team jumping event at the 1920 Summer Olympics.

References

External links
 

1888 births
1986 deaths
American male equestrians
Olympic equestrians of the United States
Equestrians at the 1920 Summer Olympics
Sportspeople from Iowa